Michael Rangel (born  8 March 1991) is a Colombian professional footballer who plays as a forward for Liga MX club Mazatlán.

Honours

Club

Alianza Petrolera
Categoría Primera B (1): 2012–II

Santa Fe
Categoría Primera A (1): 2014–II

Junior
Superliga Colombiana (1): 2019
Categoría Primera A (1): 2019–I

America
Categoría Primera A (1): 2019–II

External links
 

1991 births
Living people
Colombian footballers
Colombia international footballers
Colombian expatriate footballers
Categoría Primera A players
Categoría Primera B players
Süper Lig players
Real Santander footballers
Alianza Petrolera players
Atlético Nacional footballers
Envigado F.C. players
Independiente Santa Fe footballers
Millonarios F.C. players
Kasımpaşa S.K. footballers
Atlético Bucaramanga footballers
América de Cali footballers
Association football forwards
Colombian expatriate sportspeople in Turkey
Expatriate footballers in Turkey
Sportspeople from Santander Department